Verbascum densiflorum, the denseflower mullein or dense-flowered mullein, is a plant species in the genus Verbascum.

References

External links

 Verbascum.org

densiflorum
Plants described in 1810